K. B. Ganapathy is an Indian entrepreneur and author. He is the Chief Editor of Star of Mysore, an Indian evening daily newspaper in the English language published and widely read in Mysore. He is also the editor of Mysooru Mithra, a morning daily newspaper of Mysore and in the Kannada language. He has also written a number of books.

Early life

He has a bachelor's degree in arts (B.A.) and another bachelor's degree in law (B.L.). He also holds a Diploma in Journalism from Bombay (now Mumbai). Between the years 1961–1965, he worked as an advocate in the Karnataka High Court and Civil Courts, in Bangalore. He later worked as a Journalist in 'Free-Press Journal' and 'The Indian Express', as a reporter and then as the sub-editor, in Bombay until 1970. In 1970 he became the executive director of an Advertising Firm in Poona and remained as such until 1977.

Editor

In 1978 he founded and published two newspapers in Mysore. One is in English called the Star of Mysore and the other in Kannada called Mysooru Mithra ("Mysore's Friend"). He has been the editor and the publisher of both the newspapers ever since. He has also been a regular contributor to several newspapers and magazines. He served as a member of Karnataka Patrika Akademi (Karnataka Newspapers Academy) between the years 1993 and 1995. He was awarded the Karnataka Patrika Akademi Award in 2001. He is also the vice-president of Mysore District Journalists Association.

Widely travelled, he has been to South-east Asia, the US, Israel, Egypt, England and Australia. For six years he was the vice-president of Cauvery College as well.

Books

He has also written and published a number of novels in Kannada and English. In 1992, he wrote a novel called Adarshavadi in Kannada. The following year (1993) he wrote a travelogue called America – An Area of Light in English. The next year (1994) he wrote another novel called The Cross and the Coorgs in English. This was later written in Kannada as well. He also compiled a book called Abracadabra, which is a collection of his selected columns, in 2003 In 2009, he wrote another book in English called Gandhi's Epistle to Obama.
 Sources                                                                                                         
 1.A.R.Shantha-Korkantzis, K.B.GANAPATHY /"THE STAR OF MYSORE"/"MYSOORU MITHRA. "Apodemon Epos" Magazine of European Art Center (EUARCE) of Greece, 5st issue 1998 p. 5 https://docs.wixstatic.com/ugd/bbb0cf_154eb57bcb214901b001eb7ec1db0634.pdf

References

External links 
 
 
 Abracadabra Column
 On sans serif
 On Churumuri

Living people
Indian editors
Businesspeople from Mysore
Kodava people
Year of birth missing (living people)